Newton Aycliffe is a railway station on the Tees Valley Line, which runs between  and  via . It is owned by Network Rail and managed by Northern Trains.

History
The station is located on the original alignment of the Stockton and Darlington Railway, where it junctioned with the Clarence Railway at what was then known as Simpasture Junction. 

The station is a relatively recent addition, having only opened by British Rail on 9 January 1978.

Facilities
Station facilities here have been improved as part of the Tees Valley Metro project. The package for this station included new fully lit waiting shelters, digital CIS displays, renewed station signage and the installation of CCTV. In 2018, Arriva Rail North installed a ticket machine. The long-line Public Address system (PA) has been renewed and upgraded with pre-recorded train announcements.

Services

As of the May 2021 timetable change, the station is served by an hourly service between Saltburn and Bishop Auckland via Darlington. All services are operated by Northern Trains.

Rolling stock used: Class 156 Super Sprinter and Class 158 Express Sprinter

References

External links
 
 

Railway stations in County Durham
DfT Category F1 stations
Railway stations opened by British Rail
Railway stations in Great Britain opened in 1978
Northern franchise railway stations